William Brook-Smith (1 May 1885 – 2 August 1952) was a New Zealand cricketer. He played 29 first-class matches for Auckland between 1905 and 1923.

Career
In his first first-class match, aged 19, Brook-Smith scored 112 not out, reaching his century in 105 minutes, against Hawke's Bay in March 1905. He and James Hussey added 115 for the ninth wicket. Auckland won by an innings, and nobody else in the match reached 50. In December 1905 The New Zealand Herald described him as a "stylish and dashing young batsman, particularly good in late cutting, and free scorer all round [the] wicket".

In 1907-08 he played in the first Plunket Shield match, opening the batting with Lancelot Hemus and making 53 of their partnership of 100. Later that season he scored 110, the only century of the match, when Auckland beat Otago. In 1910-11 he was the highest scorer in a low-scoring match against Wellington, making 33 and 72 not out in a narrow victory that enabled Auckland to retain the Plunket Shield.

He played once for New Zealand, in their last match before World War I, scoring 46 and 18 against Australia in March 1914.

See also
 List of Auckland representative cricketers

References

External links
 

1885 births
1952 deaths
New Zealand cricketers
Pre-1930 New Zealand representative cricketers
Auckland cricketers
Cricketers from Auckland